The Madurai BRTS is a proposed bus rapid transit system for the city of Madurai in Tamil Nadu.

Corridors
The following corridors were proposed for implementation.

Corridor 1: Fatima College — Palanganatham junction [along Dindigul by-pass road]
Corridor 2: Kamarajar Bridge — Ring Road at Viraghanoor [along Vaigai River North bank road]

References

Proposed bus rapid transit in India
Transport in Madurai
BRTS
Proposed infrastructure in Tamil Nadu